This is a list of the players who were on the rosters of the given teams that participated in the 1996 Summer Paralympics for wheelchair rugby.

Teams











Source: Paralympic.org

References